Following are the results of the Women's 1 metre springboard diving event at the 2009 World Aquatics Championships held in Rome, Italy, from July 17 to August 2, 2009.

Results

Green denotes finalists

External links
Preliminary  Results
Final  Results

Diving at the 2009 World Aquatics Championships
Aqua